Chandraraja may refer to:

 Chandraraja I (r. c. 759-751 CE), Shakambhari Chahamana king of India
 Chandraraja II (r. c. 836-863 CE), Shakambhari Chahamana king of India